ANW may refer to:

 American Ninja Warrior, a U.S. television series in the Ninja Warrior franchise
 Australian Ninja Warrior, an Australian television series in the Ninja Warrior franchise
 Ainsworth Regional Airport (IATA code: ANW), Ainsworth, Nebraska, USA
 Aviación Del Noroeste, S.A. de C.V. (ICAO code: ANW), a Mexican airline, see List of airline codes (A)
 West Allentown (Amtrak code: ANW), an Amtrak Station in Allentown, Pennsylvania, USA
 Argentine North Western Railway
 Aegean Marine Petroleum Network Inc. (NYSE ticker: ANW)
 Harpoon Advanced Naval Warfare, a videogame in the Harpoon
 Anaang language (ISO 639 code: anw)
  (ANW), a governmental online dictionary

See also
ANWS, Association of Northwest Steelheaders
A&W (disambiguation)